Desmocladus flexuosus is a rhizatomous, sedge-like herb in the Restionaceae family, endemic to south-west Western Australia.

Taxonomy
It was first described in 1810 by Robert Brown as Restio flexuosus, but in 1998 Barbara Briggs and L.A.S.Johnson reassigned it to the genus, Desmocladus.

References

External links
Desmocladus flexuousus Occurrence data from the Australasian Virtual Herbarium

Flora of Western Australia
Plants described in 1810
flexuosus
Taxa named by Robert Brown (botanist, born 1773)